Ostroveni is a commune in Dolj County, Oltenia, Romania with a population of 5,684 people. It is composed of two villages, Lișteava and Ostroveni.

References

Communes in Dolj County
Localities in Oltenia